ZAK Spółka Akcyjna (ZAK S.A.), now renamed Grupa Azoty Kędzierzyn, is a chemical company based in the city of Kędzierzyn, Opole Voivodeship, southwest Poland.

It is part of the Grupa Azoty chemical companies holding company.

Products
Grupa Azoty Kędzierzyn produces nitrogen fertilizers (16% share of the Polish market), OXO alcohols (the sole producer in Poland, close to 10% share of the European market), and phthalate plasticizers (approximately 73% and 6% share of the domestic and European markets, respectively).

In 2007, the company's consolidated sales revenue amounted to PLN 1.67 billion (€375 million), while the net profit reached PLN 115.3 million (€26 million).

References

External links
 Official Grupa Azoty Kędzierzyn website — formerly Zakłady Azotowe Kędzierzyn−ZAK S.A.
 Grupa Azoty website—

Chemical companies of Poland
Companies based in Tarnów
Government-owned companies of Poland
Buildings and structures in Kędzierzyn-Koźle